{{DISPLAYTITLE:Mu1 Octantis}}

Mu1 Octantis, Latinized from μ1 Octantis, is a solitary star in the southern circumpolar constellation Octans. It has an apparent magnitude of 5.98, allowing it to be faintly visible to the naked eye under ideal conditions.

This object is an F-type star with the blended luminosity class of a giant star and a bright giant. At present it has 1.36 times the mass of the Sun but has expanded to 4.68 times its girth. Mu1 Octantis is metal enriched and has an age of 900 million years.

References

Octans
F-type giants
F-type bright giants
Octantis, Mu1
Octantis, 50
Durchmusterung objects
196051
102162
7863